The John W. Huffman research group at Clemson University synthesized over 450 cannabinoids.  Some of those are:

See also 
 List of AM cannabinoids
 List of CP cannabinoids
 List of HU cannabinoids
 List of miscellaneous designer cannabinoids

Notes

References